Juan Francisco Cabrera Torres (born June 9, 1979) is a male professional track and road cyclist from Chile. He represented his native country at the 1999 Pan American Games in Winnipeg, Manitoba, Canada.

Career

1999
10th in General Classification Vuelta Ciclista de Chile (CHI)
2000
1st in Sprints Classification Vuelta Ciclista de Chile (CHI)
2003
2nd in Stage 1 Vuelta Ciclista de Chile, Chillan (CHI)
1st in Stage 2 Vuelta Ciclista de Chile, Linares (CHI)
3rd in Stage 4 Vuelta Ciclista de Chile, Curepto (CHI)
2nd in Stage 1 Vuelta a Zamora, Santa Cristina (ESP)
1st in Stage 4 Vuelta a Zamora, Zamora (ESP)
2004
3rd in Stage 2 part a Vuelta Ciclista Lider al Sur, Valdivia (CHI)
1st in Stage 7 Vuelta Ciclista Lider al Sur, Concepcion (CHI)
2nd in Stage 6 part b Vuelta Ciclista de Chile, Algarrobo (CHI)
2005
1st in Stage 2 part b Vuelta Ciclista Lider al Sur, Ancud (CHI)
3rd in Stage 3 Vuelta Ciclista Lider al Sur, Osorno (CHI)
1st in Stage 5 Vuelta Ciclista Lider al Sur, Temuco (CHI)
3rd in Stage 10 Vuelta Ciclista Lider al Sur, Maitén (CHI)
2nd in General Classification Vuelta Ciclista Lider al Sur (CHI)
1st in  National Championship, Road, Elite, Chile (CHI)
3rd in Stage 1 part a Vuelta Ciclista de Chile, Curicó (CHI)
3rd in Stage 5 Vuelta Ciclista de Chile, Villa Alemana (CHI)
2nd in Stage 7 Vuelta Ciclista de Chile, Circuito Santiago (CHI)
6th in General Classification Vuelta Ciclista de Chile (CHI)
2006
1st in Stage 2 Vuelta Ciclista Lider al Sur, Osorno (CHI)
2nd in Stage 3 part a Vuelta Ciclista Lider al Sur, Valdivia (CHI)
1st in Stage 3 part b Vuelta Ciclista Lider al Sur, Mafil (CHI)
alongside Marco Arriagada, Andrei Sartassov, Jorge Giacinti, Gonzalo Garrido, and Jaime Bretti
2nd in Stage 5 Vuelta Ciclista Lider al Sur, Cañete (CHI)
3rd in Stage 1 Vuelta Ciclista de Chile, La Serena circuit (CHI)
3rd in Stage 4 part a Vuelta Ciclista de Chile, Valparaíso (CHI)
1st in Stage 8 Vuelta a Sucre, Cumana (VEN)
3rd in Stage 2 part A Vuelta al Estado Zulia (VEN)
3rd in Stage 2 part B Vuelta al Estado Zulia (VEN)
2nd in South American Games, Road, Elite, Mar del Plata (ARG)
2007
2nd in Stage 1 Vuelta a Peru, Cusco (PER)
2nd in Stage 5 Vuelta a Peru, Reparticion (PER)
1st in Stage 6 Vuelta a Peru, Arequipa (PER)
2nd in  National Championship, Road, Elite, Chile (CHI)
1st in Stage 1 Vuelta Ciclista Lider al Sur, Osorno (CHI)
1st in Stage 2 part b Vuelta Ciclista Lider al Sur, Mafil (CHI)
alongside Marco Arriagada, Andrei Sartassov, Jorge Giacinti, Gonzalo Garrido, and Antonio Cabrera
2nd in Stage 4 Vuelta Ciclista Lider al Sur, Cañete (CHI)
2nd in Stage 5 Vuelta Ciclista Lider al Sur, Concepcion (CHI)
3rd in Stage 6 Vuelta Ciclista Lider al Sur, Talca (CHI)
1st in Stage 7 part a Vuelta Ciclista Lider al Sur, Curicó (CHI)
3rd in Juegos del Alba, Road, Individual Time Trial, San Carlos de Austria, Venezuela
3rd in Juegos del Hibere, Road, Individual Time Trial, San Carlos de Austria, Venezuela

References
 

1979 births
Living people
Chilean male cyclists
Chilean track cyclists
Cyclists at the 1999 Pan American Games
Vuelta Ciclista de Chile stage winners
Place of birth missing (living people)
South American Games silver medalists for Chile
South American Games medalists in cycling
Competitors at the 2006 South American Games
Pan American Games competitors for Chile